Degen may refer to:


Weaponry
Swiss degen, a type of short sword of the late medieval and Renaissance period
the German term for a dress sword
Degen (SS), a type of straight saber used by the German SS
the German term for the épée in modern sport fencing

Places
Degen, Switzerland, a former municipality in Surselva, Graubünden, Switzerland
Dêgên, a township in Nagqu prefecture, Tibet

Other uses
 Degen (surname)
 Dejen Gebremeskel (born 1989), Ethiopian long-distance runner

See also
 
Degeneracy (disambiguation)